Gerald Perry (born November 12, 1964) is a former American football offensive tackle who played eight seasons in the National Football League (NFL). He started in Super Bowl XXIV for the Denver Broncos. He was a star basketball player in high school, winning the honor of the state's Mr. Basketball in 1983 as a center for Dreher High School. 

On December 27, 1989 Perry was convicted of soliciting a prostitute, and was sentenced to 15 days imprisonment. He was injured in a shooting in 2009.

References

1964 births
Living people
American football offensive tackles
Denver Broncos players
Los Angeles Raiders players
Los Angeles Rams players
Northwest Mississippi Rangers football players
Oakland Raiders players
Southern Jaguars football players
Parade High School All-Americans (boys' basketball)
Basketball players from Columbia, South Carolina
Players of American football from Columbia, South Carolina